Coral Gables is a city in Miami-Dade County, Florida, United States. As of the 2020 U.S. census, it had a population of 49,248.

Coral Gables is known globally as being home to the University of Miami, one of the nation's top private research universities whose main campus spans  in the city. With 16,479 faculty and staff as of 2021, the University of Miami is the largest employer in Coral Gables and second largest employer in all of Miami-Dade County.

The city is a Mediterranean-themed planned community known for its historic and affluent character reinforced by its strict zoning, popular landmarks, and tourist sights.

History 

Coral Gables was formally incorporated as a city on April 29, 1925. It was and remains a planned community based on the popular early twentieth century City Beautiful Movement and is known for its strict zoning regulations. The city was developed by George Merrick, a real estate developer from Pennsylvania, during the Florida land boom of the 1920s. The city's architecture is almost entirely Mediterranean Revival style, mandated in the original plan, with an emphasis on Spanish influence in particular, such as the Coral Gables Congregational Church, donated by Merrick. The domed Catholic Church of the Little Flower was built somewhat later, in a similar Spanish Renaissance style. 

Early in the city's planning and development, Merrick shared his vision for Coral Gables as "a most extraordinary opportunity for the building of 'Castles in Spain'," as explored in Coral Gables historian Arva Moore Parks' 2006 book George Merrick's Coral Gables: Where Your 'Castles in Spain' are Made Real. Merrick's success in executing this vision for the city would catch the attention of Spain's King, Alfonso XIII, who awarded Merrick the Order of Isabella the Catholic for his support of Spanish culture in Coral Gables.

By 1926, the city covered  and had netted $150 million in sales, with over $100 million spent on development. That year also saw the opening of the Biltmore Hotel and Golf Course, a major landmark in city.

Merrick meticulously designed the city with distinct zones. The main artery, now known as Miracle Mile, bisected the business district. Merrick could boast that every business in Coral Gables was less than a two-block walk. The city used to have an electric trolley system, which was replaced by the popularity of modern automobiles, but now a new free circulator trolley system, initiated in November 2003, runs down Ponce de León Boulevard. Another distinctive and character-defining feature of the city planned by Merrick are the themed Coral Gables Villages that date to the 1920s and were designed to expand the city's architecture beyond Spanish influence to include Italian, French, and Dutch South African among others.

By the fall of 1926, the first class of 372 students enrolled at the university.

During World War II, many Navy pilots and mechanics were trained and housed in Coral Gables.

Coral Gables has traditionally placed high priority on historic preservation. The city passed its first preservation ordinance in 1973 as many of its founding structures from the 1920s began to reach their 50th anniversaries. Further ordinances were enacted in the 1980s establishing the Historic Preservation Board and in the 1990s establishing the Historic Preservation Department, now called the Historical Resources & Cultural Arts Department. As part of the city's historic preservation program the Historical Resources Department is tasked with researching and identifying significant properties and local landmarks for listing in the Coral Gables Registry of Historic Places as well as on national historic registers. The department also reviews modifications to locally designated landmarks and initiates grant proposals. The Historic Preservation Board is a quasi-judicial body that votes on local landmark designations and other issues pertaining to the historic character of the city.

Geography

It is bordered on the west by Red Road (West 57th Avenue) north of Sunset Drive (South 72nd Street) and West 49th Avenue and Old Cutler Roads south of Sunset Drive. It is bordered on the north by Tamiami Trail/U.S. Route 41 (South 8th Street), except for a small section that extends north of 8th Street for eight blocks between Ponce de Leon Boulevard and Douglas Road (West 37th Avenue).

On the east, it is bordered by Douglas Road (West 37th Avenue) north of South 26th Street, Monegro Street south of South 26th Street to Cadima Avenue, Ponce De Leon Boulevard south of Cadima Avenue to South Dixie Highway (U.S. Route 1), LeJeune Road (West 42nd Avenue) south of U.S. 1 to Battersea Road, and by Biscayne Bay south of Battersea Road. On the south, it is bordered by the Charles Deering Estate.

Demographics

2020 census

As of the 2020 U.S. census, there were 49,248 people, 17,921 households, and 11,181 families residing in the city.

2010 census

As of 2010, there were 20,266 households, of which 11.4% were vacant. In 2000, 24.45% had children under the age of 18 living with them. In Coral Gables, 61.11% were family households, 17.3% had a female householder with no husband present, and 38.89% were non-families. The average household size was 2.36, and the average household had 1.68 vehicles.

In 2000, the city population was spread out, with 17.4% under the age of 18, 14.58% from 18 to 24, 25.02% from 25 to 44, 27.01% from 45 to 64, and 16% who were 65 years of age or older. The median age was 39.44 years. The population consisted of 51.31% females and 48.69% males.

In 2015, estimated income figures for the city were as follows: median household income, $93,934; average household income, $150,808; per capita income, $57,195. About 7.6% of citizens were estimated to be living below the poverty line.

As of 2000, Spanish was spoken at home by 51.06% of residents, while English was the only language spoken at home by 43.83%. Other languages spoken by the population were French 1.09%, Portuguese 0.80%, Italian 0.72%, and German speakers made up 0.53% of the populace.

Tourism

Coral Gables is a pedestrian-friendly destination. Located four miles from Miami International Airport, the "City Beautiful" has around 140 dining establishments and gourmet shops, and many notable international retailers. Among Coral Gables landmarks are the Venetian Pool, Douglas Entrance, and Miami Biltmore hotel.

Media
Coral Gables has one newspaper, Coral Gables News Tribune, which is published twice monthly and covers local and regional news and one weekly newspaper that is published as part of the portfolio of Miami Community Newspapers publications.

At the University of Miami in Coral Gables, The Miami Hurricane, the official student newspaper, is published weekly each Tuesday.

Coral Gables is part of the Miami-area media market.

In popular culture
Numerous movies have been filmed fully or partially in Coral Gables, including Nude on the Moon (1961), Goldilocks and the Three Bares (1963), Jimmy, the Boy Wonder (1966), I Eat Your Skin (1971), Shock Waves (1977), Absence of Malice (1981), The Mean Season (1985), Miami Rhapsody (1995), Bad Boys (1995), The Perez Family (1995), Fair Game (1995), Two Much (1995), Blood and Wine (1996), Curdled (1996), Wild Things (1998), The Hours (2002), My Sexiest Year (2007), Dostna (2008), Posthumous (2012), and others.

The city also is featured in television and video games, including:

The 2014 indie point-and-click adventure game A Golden Wake is based on the founding and development of Coral Gables in the 1920s.
Also, in 2014, the comedy-drama television series Looking features a character named Augustin who is from Coral Gables.
Coral Gables is the birthplace of Scott Lang (Ant-Man) and Dr. Curt Connors in Marvel Universe.

Economy

Coral Gables holds several of the wealthiest zip codes (33156, 33143, 33133, and 33146) and neighborhoods in the United States, such as Hammock Oaks, Old Cutler Bay, Gables Estates, Tahiti Beach, Snapper Creek and Lakes, Cocoplum, and Gables By The Sea.

Major economic contributors to Coral Gables include:

 The University of Miami, the largest employer in Coral Gables since the city's founding (16,479 faculty and staff employees as of 2022).
 Baptist Hospital of Miami, the second largest employer in Coral Gables.
 Bacardi, which has its United States headquarters with 300 employees at 2701 Le Jeune Road.
 Capital Bank Financial 
 Intelsat has its Latin American headquarters in Suite 1100 at One Alhambra Plaza.
 Fresh Del Monte Produce has its headquarters in Coral Gables.
 ExxonMobil has marine fuels operations in Suite 900 at One Alhambra Plaza in Coral Gables.
 MasTec, the second largest Hispanic-owned company in the nation, is located at 800 South Douglas Road.
 Odebrecht Construction, Inc. has over 300 employees at its location at 201 Alhambra Circle.
 American Airlines maintains Ponce de Leon Travel Center at 901 Ponce De Leon Boulevard.
 MoneyGram has its Miami Office in Coral Gables.
 Dolphin Entertainment is an independent film studio that is located in Coral Gables.

Transportation

Coral Gables is served by Metrobus throughout the area, and by Miami Metrorail at:

  Douglas Road (SW 37th Avenue and U.S. 1)
  University (Stanford Drive and U.S. 1)

Coral Gables provides a free trolley service, with a trolley running a continuous circuit up and down Ponce de Leon Boulevard during the day.

Coral Gables is served by rapid transit on Douglas Road at Douglas Road station at the University of Miami at University Station near Sunset Drive and Red Road at South Miami station, which connects the city with Downtown Miami and Miami International Airport.

Diplomatic missions
Several countries operate consulates in Coral Gables, including Barbados, Colombia, El Salvador, Italy, Peru, Spain, Monaco, St. Lucia, and Uruguay.

Several countries have honorary consulates located in Coral Gables, including Australia, Belize, Hungary, Senegal, St. Kitts & Nevis, Togo, and Thailand. The Taipei Economic and Cultural Office maintains Taiwan's diplomatic mission at 2333 Ponce De Leon Boulevard in Coral Gables.

Education

University of Miami

The University of Miami, a private university ranked in the top tier of national universities, with particular national status in the fields of business, engineering, law, marine science, medicine, communications, and music, is located in Coral Gables.

Primary and secondary schools
Public schools
Coral Gables schools are part of Miami-Dade School District, which serves Miami-Dade County. The district has several high schools in Coral Gables, most notably Coral Gables Senior High School and International Studies Preparatory Academy, both of which educate students in grades nine through 12.  It also has a K–8 school, Coral Gables Preparatory Academy (formerly Coral Gables Elementary School), with two campuses, including a historic campus located on Ponce de Leon Boulevard. Henry S. West Laboratory Elementary is another school for K–6. Finally it has two middle schools: George Washington Carver Middle School located on Lincoln Drive and Ponce de Leon Middle School located across from the University of Miami on the east side of U.S. Route 1 on Augusto Street. Present day George Washington Carver Middle was moved to the current location on Grand Avenue on land donated by George Merrick. When Carver died in 1942, the school was renamed in his honor.

Private schools
Gulliver Academy, Marian C. Krutulis Campus, a PreK–8 school that is a member of Gulliver Schools, is within Coral Gables. The management offices of Gulliver Schools were formerly located in Coral Gables. The lower campus of Riviera Schools is located in Coral Gables.

The historic St. Theresa Catholic School, a Pre-K–8 school is located near Coral Gables Biltmore Hotel. St. Philip's Episcopal School, French-American School of Miami, and St. Thomas Episcopal Parish School, all Pre-K–5 schools, are also located in Coral Gables. Coral Gables Preparatory Academy, a private K-8 school, is located in Coral Gables.

Public libraries

Miami-Dade Public Library System operates Coral Gables Branch Library in Coral Gables.

Notable people

 Marc Anthony, salsa singer
 Juan Alvarez, former professional pitcher for Anaheim Angels, Florida Marlins, and Texas Rangers
 Zach Banks, racing driver
 Dave Barry, Pulitzer Prize-winning humorist
 Shane Battier, former professional basketball player, Houston Rockets, Memphis Grizzlies, and Miami Heat
Bruce R. Berkowitz, mutual fund manager
 Columba Bush, former First Lady of Florida
 Jeb Bush, 43rd Governor of Florida
 Marty Bystrom, former professional pitcher for the New York Yankees and Philadelphia Phillies
 Maxine Clark, founder of Build-a-Bear Workshop
 Colleen Corby, model
 Alice Dixson, actress, commercial model, and former beauty queen
 Gail Edwards, actress, It's a Living, Blossom, Full House Gus Gandarillas, former professional pitcher for Milwaukee Brewers
 Juan Ramón Jiménez, Nobel Prize-winning author
 Dane Johnson, former professional pitcher for Chicago White Sox, Oakland Athletics, and Toronto Blue Jays
 José José, pop singer
 Nancy Kopp, former Treasurer of Maryland 
 Soia Mentschikoff, legal scholar and law professor at Harvard Law School
 Marilyn Milian, judge, The People's Court''
 Thurston Moore, singer, songwriter and guitarist of Sonic Youth
 Alonzo Mourning, former basketball player for Charlotte Hornets, Miami Heat and New Jersey Nets
 Jesús Permuy, architect, human rights advocate, businessman, and radio host
 Mimi Rogers, actress
 Jon Secada, Latin pop singer
 Roy Sekoff, founding editor Huffington Post
 George D. Shea, U.S. Army major general
 Pamela Smart, murderer convicted in notorious case
 Oliver Sollitt, Illinois state representative and businessman
 Jonathan Vilma, former professional football player, New Orleans Saints and New York Jets
 Lester J. Whitlock, U.S. Army major general
 Dewing Woodward, artist, philanthropist, and first art professor at the University of Miami

Places of interest

 Coral Gables Villages
 Coral Way
 Fairchild Tropical Botanic Garden
 Miami Biltmore Hotel
 Miracle Mile
 Riviera Schools
 Shops at Merrick Park
 University of Miami
 Venetian Pool

Festivals and events
Festival of Art, University of Miami, held in January
Carnival on the Mile, Miracle Mile, held in February/March
Junior Orange Bowl Festival, held in December–January

Gallery

Sister cities

Coral Gables' sister cities are:
 Aix-en-Provence, France
 Antigua Guatemala, Guatemala
 Cartagena, Colombia
 Quito, Ecuador
 San Isidro, Argentina
 Santa Tecla, El Salvador
 Seville, Spain

References

External links

Surrounding areas

 
1925 establishments in Florida
Cities in Florida
Cities in Miami-Dade County, Florida
Cities in Miami metropolitan area
Planned cities in the United States
Planned communities in Florida
Populated places established in 1925
Populated places on the Intracoastal Waterway in Florida